Gregory Normal School was the first legal school admitting African-American students in Wilmington, North Carolina.  It operated from 1868 to 1921.

It was originally known as Wilmington Normal School when it was organized by a group of eight Protestant missionaries from New England who were sponsored by the American Missionary Association.  It was renamed the Gregory Normal Institute in 1883 in honor of J. H. Gregory of Massachusetts who had made a substantial donation to the schools operations.

Gregory was a high school level school that sought to prepare its students for studying in colleges and universities elsewhere.

Alumni
George Edward Davis (educator), professor at Biddle University and later supervisor of Rosenwald School building

References

Additional sources
Wilmington Northern Star, Apr. 25, 1988
History of Education in North Carolina, p. 329

External links 

Educational institutions established in 1868
1868 establishments in North Carolina
Defunct universities and colleges in North Carolina